Bridgetown is a census-designated place (CDP) in Green Township, Hamilton County, Ohio, United States. The population was 14,731 at the 2020 census. In earlier censuses it was listed as the slightly smaller Bridgetown North CDP.

History
Bridgetown was settled circa 1820, and named after Bridgeton, New Jersey, the native home of a share of the first settlers.

Bridgetown was home to The Western Hills Airport (Also called "Frank Airport" and "Cheviot Airport") and was the first airport in western Hamilton County, Ohio. Airport operations began in 1929, shutdown during World War II, then reopened after the end of the war, slowly declining until the corporation ceased services in 1949 as aircraft outgrew the facilities.

Geography
Ohio State Route 264, Bridgetown Road, runs through the center of the community.

Education
The community is within Oak Hills Local School District. Oakdale Elementary School, Bridgetown Middle School and Oak Hills High School are within Bridgetown. Catholic Middle Schools include St. Jude and St. Aloysius Gonzaga.

References

Census-designated places in Hamilton County, Ohio
Census-designated places in Ohio
1820 establishments in Ohio